The Veracruz shrew (Sorex veraecrucis) is a species of mammal in the family Soricidae. It is found in Mexico.

References

Sorex
Mammals described in 1925